The 1939 World Table Tennis Championships mixed doubles was the 13th edition of the mixed doubles championship.  

Bohumil Váňa and Věra Votrubcová defeated Václav Tereba and Marie Kettnerová in the final by three sets to two.

Results

See also
List of World Table Tennis Championships medalists

References

-